The Writers' Union of Moldova is a professional association of writers in Moldova.

Mihai Cimpoi has been the president of the Writers' Union of Moldova since 1991.

External links 
 Uniunea Scriitorilor din Republica Moldova
 Povestea premiilor Uniunii Scriitorilor din Moldova
 C. Tănase Scrisoare către scriitori

Writers' Union
Romanian literature
Writers' organizations by country
Organizations established in 1954
Professional associations based in Moldova